The Gozo Football League Second Division, known as BOV GFL Second Division for sponsorship reasons, is the second and lowest level in the Gozo Football League. The league was first competed in 1948.

The Second Division is played in the same manner as the First Division: based on three rounds, each club plays three games against every other team for a total of 15 games. The season is usually held between September and April, and at the end of the season, the champion is automatically promoted to next season's First Division season and replaces the bottom-placed club from the First Division. The second-placed club plays a promotion and relegation play-off against the seventh-placed team in the First Division, with the winner earning the right to play in the top tier the following season.

The majority of the matches are played at the Kercem Ground, with the occasional use of the Gozo Stadium. Current top form player is Julian Camilleri playing for Xaghra United F.C.

Clubs

2022–23 season 

The following clubs are competing in the 2022-23 Second Division season.

Champions 

1948–49 Salesian Youths
1952–53 Nadur Olympians
1953–54 Kerċem Ajax
1957–58 Nadur Olympians
1958–59 Victoria Hotspurs
1959–60 St. George's
1961–62 Xagħra Young Stars
1962–63  S.K. Victoria Wanderers
1963–64 Għajnsielem
1964–65 Xewkija Tigers
1965–66 Għajnsielem
1966–67 Sannat Lions
1967–68 Victoria United
1968–69 Xagħra Young Stars
1969–70 Xewkija Tigers
1970–71 Oratory Youths
1971–72 Xagħra United
1972–73 Xewkija Tigers
1973–74 Sannat Lions
1975–76 Kerċem Ajax
1977–78 SK Victoria Wanderers
1978–79 Xagħra United
1979–80 Calypsian Bosco Youths
1980–81 Xewkija Tigers
1981–82 Ghajnsielem
1983–84 S.K. Victoria Wanderers
1984–85 Ghajnsielem
1987–88 Xewkija Tigers
1988–89 Żebbuġ Rovers
1989–90 Nadur Youngsters
1990–91 Munxar Falcons
1991–92 S.K. Victoria Wanderers
1992–93 Żebbuġ Rovers
1993–94 St. Lawrence Spurs
1994–95 Qala St. Joseph
1995–96 Xewkija Tigers
1996–97 Kerċem Ajax
1997–98 Żebbuġ Rovers
1998–99 St. Lawrence Spurs
1999–2000 Kerċem Ajax
2000–01 Sannat Lions
2001–02 Xagħra United
2002–03 Sannat Lions
2003–04 Xagħra United
2004–05 Sannat Lions
2005–06 Qala St. Joseph
2006–07 Victoria Hotspurs
2007–08 S.K. Victoria Wanderers
2008–09 Xewkija Tigers
2009–10 St. Lawrence Spurs
2010–11 Xagħra United
2011–12 Kerċem Ajax
2012–13 Oratory Youths
2013–14 St. Lawrence Spurs
2014–15 Għajnsielem
2015–16 Xagħra United
2016–17 Għarb Rangers
2017–18 Munxar Falcons
2018–19 Xagħra United
2019–20 Sannat Lions F.C.
2021–22 Qala Saints

Wins by club 

 Clubs participating in the 2018–19 GFL Second Division are denoted in bold type
 Clubs no longer active are denoted in italics

References

External links 
 Official website of Gozo FA

2
competitions
Gozo